Francesco Imberti was the Italian archbishop of the Roman Catholic Archdiocese of Vercelli from his appointment by Pope Pius XII on 10 October 1945 until his retirement on 5 September 1966.

Biography 

Born in Racconigi in 1882, he was graduated in theology and ordained priest in 1906. He was priesthood in Turin Cathedral.

He was appointed bishop of Aosta on 23 July 1932 and archbishop of Vercelli on 10 October 1945. He was council father during the four sessions of Second Vatican Council. He retired on 7 September 1966 and died on 27 January 1967 at the age of 84.

Bibliography 

 Giuseppe Tuninetti, In memoriam. Clero della diocesi di Torino defunto dal 1951 al 2007. Vescovi, preti e diaconi, Torino, Effatà, 2008, pp. 38–39, .

References

External links
Profile of Mons. Imberti www.catholic-hierarchy.org 
Official Page of archdiocese of Vercelli

1882 births
Bishops of Aosta
20th-century Italian Roman Catholic archbishops
1967 deaths
People from Racconigi